1829 in archaeology

Explorations
 'Charles Masson' (James Lewis) explores the Indus Valley civilisation and locates the site of Harappa.

Excavations
 First excavations at Olympia, Greece by an expedition led by Abel Blouet
 Yorkshire Philosophical Society concludes excavation of St Mary's Abbey, York, England, prior to construction of the Yorkshire Museum on part of the site.

Finds
 Engis 2, part of the skull of a young child and other bones, recognised in 1936 as the first known Neanderthal fossil, is found in the Awirs cave near Engis in the United Kingdom of the Netherlands (modern-day Belgium) by Philippe-Charles Schmerling.

Publications

Births

Deaths
 10 May - Thomas Young, English Egyptologist (b. 1773)

See also
 List of years in archaeology
 1828 in archaeology
 1830 in archaeology

References

Archaeology
Archaeology by year
Archaeology
Archaeology